Aecidium magellanicum, commonly known as the calafate rust, is a species of rust fungi. This fungus can cause a growth defect known as a witches broom, an excessive growth of stems from a single point on a branch. The species is known to infect the evergreen shrub Berberis buxifolia in Argentina and Chile.

References

External links
Index Fungorum

Pucciniales
Fungi described in 1847
Taxa named by Miles Joseph Berkeley
Fungi of South America